The Mayor of Scranton is the chief executive of the government of Scranton, Pennsylvania, as stipulated by the Charter of the City of Scranton. The current Mayor of Scranton is Democrat Paige Cognetti.

From 1866, mayors were elected by popular vote.

List of mayors of Scranton

References

Sources
  Wenzel, David J. (2006). Scranton's Mayors. Eynon,PA: Tribute Books.